"Baarish Lete Aana" ( "Bring the Rain") is a song sung  by Darshan Raval. It was officially released on 18 July 2018 by Indie Music Label and the unplugged version was released on 7 November 2018. The original video has over 49 million views on YouTube as of February 2022.

References

2018 songs
Hindi film songs